San Donà di Piave-Jesolo is a railway station serving the town of San Donà di Piave and the seaside resort of Jesolo, in the region of Veneto, northern Italy. The station is located on the Venice–Trieste railway. The train services are operated by Trenitalia.

Modernisation
In 2009, in anticipation of the restructuring of the services in the Veneto Region the station was moved a few hundred metres further east, towards Trieste.

Train services
The station is served by the following service(s):

High speed services (Frecciarossa) Turin - Milan - Verona - Padua - Venice - Trieste
Intercity services Rome - Florence - Bologna - Padua - Venice - Trieste
Express services (Regionale Veloce) Venice - Portogruaro - Cervignano del Friuli - Trieste
Express services ( Regionale Veloce ) Verona - Padua - Venice - Latisana
Local services (Treno regionale) Venice - Portogruaro

See also

History of rail transport in Italy
List of railway stations in Veneto
Rail transport in Italy
Railway stations in Italy

References

 This article is based upon a translation of the Italian language version as of January 2016.

External links

Railway stations in Veneto